The 2015 Colorado Springs Switchbacks FC season was the club's first season of existence, and their first season in United Soccer League, the third division of the American soccer pyramid. The Switchbacks play in the Western Conference of USL.

Competitions

Preseason

USL

USL Playoffs

U.S. Open Cup

References

Colorado Springs Switchbacks FC seasons
Colorado Springs Switchbacks FC
Colorado Springs Switchbacks FC